The year 561 BC was a year of the pre-Julian Roman calendar. In the Roman Empire, it was known as year 193 Ab urbe condita. The denomination 561 BC for this year has been used since the early medieval period, when the Anno Domini calendar era became the prevalent method in Europe for naming years.

Events
 Croesus becomes king of Lydia (or 560 BC).
 All eight solar system planets, including the now redefined dwarf planet Pluto, fall into planetary alignment.

Deaths
 Alyattes, king of Lydia (or 560 BC)
 Zedekiah, king of Judah

References

560s BC